Theloderma palliatum (common name: cloaked moss frog) is a species of frog in the family Rhacophoridae. It is endemic to Vietnam and so far only known from the Bidoup Núi Bà and Chư Yang Sin National Parks. This species, together with Theloderma nebulosum, was first found by Australian and Vietnamese scientists in Tay Nguyen in 2011.

Description
An adult female, first described as a distinct species, Theloderma chuyangsinense, measures  in snout–vent length. The body is relatively slender. The head is slightly longer than it is wide. The snout is bluntly truncate in dorsal view and truncate in profile. The tympanum is distinct. Both finger and toe discs are well-developed, but the finger discs are larger than the toes discs . The fingers are unwebbed whereas the toes have basal webbing. The dorsum is weakly rugose with sparsely scattered minute, pearly asperities. The ventral surface of thighs and belly are coarsely granular, while the chest and throat are smooth. In specimens from the Bidoup Núi Bà National Park, the dorsum is pale coppery brown with distinct dark warm brown markings, which are more distinct at night. The specimen from Chư Yang Sin National Park had pale-yellow to light straw-brown dorsum, with dark-brown blotches and spots of various sizes and shapes.

Habitat
Specimens have been recorded sitting on leaves 1–2 metres above ground and on the ground. Some specimens were collected near streams while others were found further away. It is rare in the Bidoup Núi Bà National Park, with only three specimens collected during 20 surveys conducted over a three-year period. However, the apparent rarity of the species could simply be caused by poor detectability associated with its small size and arboreal habits.

Conservation
Habitat loss and modification, caused by aquaculture, agriculture (coffee), infrastructure, and harvest of forest products, are occurring inside the Bidoup Núi Bà National Park. As a consequence, this species is believed to be declining.

References

palliatum
Frogs of Asia
Amphibians of Vietnam
Endemic fauna of Vietnam
Amphibians described in 2011
Taxa named by Jodi Rowley